William Aloysius Barrett (August 14, 1896 – April 12, 1976) was an American lawyer, politician, and member of the Democratic Party who served in the United States House of Representatives, representing Pennsylvania's 1st congressional district from 1945 to 1947 and again from 1949 until his death in Philadelphia, Pennsylvania in 1976.

Early life
William Aloysius Barrett was born on August 14, 1896, in Philadelphia, Pennsylvania, the son of Irish immigrants. He had thirteen siblings, and his father died when he was two years old, forcing his mother to scrub floors to support the family. Barrett initially went to school at Thomas Parochial School, but he left and sought work to support the family. He soon found employment as an apprentice boilermaker and welder at the Atlantic Refining Company's plant at Point Breeze, carrying a union card for the Boilermakers' Union until his death. Later, he resumed his education, attending the Brown Preparatory School in Philadelphia and St. Joseph's College. He subsequently studied law at the South Jersey Law School in Camden, New Jersey, before working in the real estate business. However, he found the most success in running a taproom.

Barrett married Rose Timmins, two years his junior, and the couple had four children: John in 1921, William Jr. in 1923, Rose in 1924, and Gertrude in 1925. His wife, Rose, died in 1964. By the time of Barrett's death in 1976, he had fifteen grandchildren.

In his first forays into local politics, Barrett served on the Philidelphia Board of Mercantile Appraisers and the Democratic City Committee, but lost two Philadelphia City Council races in 1935 and 1939. However, Barrett persisted, serving as a legislative aide to Congressman James P. McGranery until McGranery resigned to become an assistant to the Attorney General in 1943. Barrett ran in the January 1944 special election to succeed McGranery, but lost to Republican Joseph M. Pratt.

Congress
Barrett ran for Congress again in the November elections later that year, defeating incumbent Republican James A. Gallagher, but lost to him in a rematch during the Republican sweep of Congress two years later. Despite his loss, Barrett was dead set on returning to Congress, succeeding in November of 1948. He won re-election thirteen subsequent times. 

In the House, Barrett quickly established himself as a mainstream liberal Democrat. However, the peak of his legislative career started in 1965, when he became the chairman of the Housing Subcommittee of the Banking, Currency and Housing, a position he excelled in due to his background in real estate and housing. Serving in this capacity, Barrett was instrumental in passing the Housing and Urban Development Acts of 1965, 1968, 1969, and 1970, the Emergency Home Finance Act of 1970, the Housing and Community Development Act of 1974 and many more pieces of significant housing legislation. He was also crucial in passing the Lead-Based Paint Poisoning Prevention Act of 1970 and the Federal Disaster Prevention Act of 1973. By the time of his death in 1976, he was also the ranking member of the larger Banking, Currency, and Housing committee, one of the most powerful committees in the House. According to fellow Pennsylvania congressman William J. Green, "The legislation for which Bill Barrett was responsible during his years as chairman of [the Housing Subcommittee on Banking, Currency and Housing] would form a proud legacy for any 10 Members of Congress." Barrett was also a staunch supporter of civil rights, voting for the 1957, 1960, 1964, and 1968 Civil Rights Acts. Barrett also introduced legislation to designate the birthday of Martin Luther King Jr. as a legal public holiday in January 1973, thirteen years before its first official observance in 1986. Due to his Catholic faith, Barrett was a strong opponent of abortion, unsuccessfully introducing a constitutional amendment to outlaw it in 1975.

During his tenure in Congress, he also acquired a reputation for being extremely devoted to his constituents. Most days, after working on Capitol Hill, he would fly back to Philidelphia to see his constituents in the evening, the only congressman to do so. "His interest in serving his constituents was unmatched," said Florida congressman Bob Sikes about Barrett. "Few people have worked harder for the people they represent." Russell W. Nigro, a Republican opponent of Barrett's in 1974, blamed his loss on all the favors Barrett did for various voters over the years. "He just called in a lot of IOUs," explained Nigro shortly after Barrett's death. "There aren't many people in the First Congressional District who aren't related to, or at least a close friend of, someone who has been helped out by Bill Barrett." Barrett himself, however, simply maintained: "I do this because I love people." But his devotion to his constituents sometimes earned him criticism. Ralph Nader's Congressional Study Group criticized Barrett for his provincialism, characterizing him as a "districter" who overlooked the affairs of state in concern for his district. Barrett embraced their description of him, explaining "I am very much pleased with what the book says. It hits on my activity most accurately. It is what my district needs. This is a procedure I've been following ever since I've been in public life." 

In office, Barrett built his own political organization in Philadelphia politics. Local Republicans tried to defeat him, but never achieved success, so much so that it became a joke that the Republican Party had to "scour the voter rolls trying to find someone with the courage to run against him." After Barrett's death, rival ward leader Bill Black explained how influential he was, commenting "When I found out that
a lot of my Republican committeemen had jobs through the Democratic party, then I knew why Bill Barrett was a giant in politics."

During the 1972 Democratic National Convention, one convention delegate voted for Barrett to be the Democratic vice-presidential nominee alongside Senator George McGovern, despite Barrett never seeking the office. Thomas Eagleton was nominated instead, winning 1,742 delegates.

As Barrett's time in office grew longer, the demographics of South Philadelphia neighborhoods changed. At the time of his death, his house was the only one on his block occupied by a white family. Even so, Barrett remained overwhelmingly popular with his constituents, never once falling below 60% of the vote in his re-election bids after 1950, sometimes winning well over 70% of the vote.

Death
Barrett died from pneumonia at the Philadelphia Naval Hospital in Philadelphia, Pennsylvania on April 12, 1976, at age 79.

Barrett was eulogized greatly by his colleagues on the House floor immediately after his death. Congressman Robert Giaimo characterized Barrett as "a compassionate man, gentle and kind, sensitive to the feelings of others, a man who had a firm faith in the essential goodness of his fellow man," while Minnesota Senator and former Vice President Hubert H. Humphrey also applauded Barrett's service, stating that "the House of Representatives – and indeed this entire Congress – has lost one of its most outstanding Members." House Speaker Carl Albert also praised Barrett highly, stating that "No problem was too small, none too difficult to resolve, for this dedicated and diligent servant of the people."

Barrett's funeral was held on April 14, 1976, at the Philadelphia Cathedral of Saints Peter and Paul. He was interred at Holy Cross Cemetery in Yeadon, Pennsylvania.

At the time of his death, Barrett had already announced his intention to run for reelection. Fifteen days after his death, Philadelphia voters renominated him posthumously. He was replaced on the ballot by state representative Ozzie Myers.

Electoral history

|+ Pennsylvania's 2nd congressional district: January 1944 special election
! Year
!
! Subject
! Party
! Votes
! %
!
! Opponent
! Party
! Votes
! %
|-
|1944
||
| |William A. Barrett
| |Democratic
| |19,168
| |43.41
||
| |Joseph M. Pratt
| |Republican
| |24,991
| |56.59

|+ Pennsylvania's 1st congressional district: Results 1944-1974
! Year
!
! Subject
! Party
! Votes
! %
!
! Opponent
! Party
! Votes
! %
|-
|1944
||
| |William A. Barrett
| |Democratic
| |73,289
| |58.42
||
| |James A. Gallagher (inc.)
| |Republican
| |52,159
| |41.58
|-
|1946
||
| |William A. Barrett (inc.)
| |Democratic
| |52,593
| |42.66
||
| |James A. Gallagher
| |Republican
| |70,680
| |57.34
|-
|1948
||
| |William A. Barrett
| |Democratic
| |70,165
| |53.43
||
| |John De Niro
| |Republican
| |61,165
| |46.57
|-
|1950
||
| |William A. Barrett (inc.)
| |Democratic
| |69,300
| |53.77
||
| |Robert M. Sebastian
| |Republican
| |59,593
| |46.23
|-
|1952
||
| |William A. Barrett (inc.)
| |Democratic
| |89,879
| |68.18
||
| |James Iannucci
| |Republican
| |41,948
| |31.82
|-
|1954
||
| |William A. Barrett (inc.)
| |Democratic
| |68,531
| |61.50
||
| |Joseph A. Graham
| |Republican
| |42,893
| |38.50
|-
|1956
||
| |William A. Barrett (inc.)
| |Democratic
| |74,511 
| |62.70
||
| |A.J. Cammarota
| |Republican
| |44,333 
| |37.30
|-
|1958
||
| |William A. Barrett (inc.)
| |Democratic
| |67,531 
| |64.69
||
| |Gerard Iannelli
| |Republican
| |36,854 
| |35.31
|-
|1960
||
| |William A. Barrett (inc.)
| |Democratic
| |88,505
| |76.89
||
| |Michael Grasso Jr.
| |Republican
| |26,601
| |23.11
|-
|1962
||
| |William A. Barrett (inc.)
| |Democratic
| |102,722
| |63.54
||
| |Winifred H. Malinowski
| |Republican
| |58,953
| |36.46
|-
|1964
||
| |William A. Barrett (inc.)
| |Democratic
| |129,471
| |71.83
||
| |Alvin J. Bello
| |Republican
| |50,780
| |28.17
|-
|1966
||
| |William A. Barrett (inc.)
| |Democratic
| |90,100
| |66.07
||
| |Beatrice K. Chernock
| |Republican
| |46,280
| |33.93
|-
|1968
||
| |William A. Barrett (inc.)
| |Democratic
| |113,696
| |74.74
||
| |Leslie J. Carson, Jr
| |Republican
| |38,432
| |25.26
|-
|1970
||
| |William A. Barrett (inc.)
| |Democratic
| |79,425
| |69.22
||
| |Joseph S. Ziccardi
| |Republican
| |34,649
| |30.20
|-
|1972
||
| |William A. Barrett (inc.)
| |Democratic
| |118,953
| |66.11
||
| |Gus A. Pedicone
| |Republican
| |59,807
| |33.24
|-
|1974
||
| |William A. Barrett (inc.)
| |Democratic
| |96,988
| |75.83
||
| |Russell M. Nigro
| |Republican
| |29,772
| |23.28

See also
 List of United States Congress members who died in office (1950–99)

References

Sources

The Political Graveyard
GovTrack
Newspapers.com

1896 births
1976 deaths
20th-century American politicians
American people of Irish descent
Saint Joseph's University alumni
Politicians from Philadelphia
Democratic Party members of the United States House of Representatives from Pennsylvania
Deaths from pneumonia in Pennsylvania